The South Carolina Athletic Hall of Fame is an athletics hall of fame in the U.S. state of South Carolina. It is in the capital city of Columbia.

References

Sports in South Carolina